was a junior college in Kitami, Hokkaidō, Japan.

The institute was founded in 1984 as the Hokkai Gakuen Kitami Women's Junior College. In 1991, it became coeducational and changed its name to Hokkai Gakuen Kitami Junior College. It was closed in 2004.

References

Universities and colleges in Hokkaido
Educational institutions established in 1984
Japanese junior colleges
Private universities and colleges in Japan
1984 establishments in Japan